A Night Without Armor may refer to:
 A Night Without Armor (book), a 1998 book of poetry by Jewel
 A Night Without Armor (film), a 2017 American film